Bryan Olesen is a Christian rock guitarist, vocalist, and songwriter.

Bryan David Olesen was born on November 1, 1973 in Hartford, Connecticut, to parents John and Norine Olesen.  He married Jennifer Hines on August 23, 1997 and has three children.

Bryan is best known for his involvement in the major Christian bands Newsboys and VOTA.

Bryan is one of the founding members of the group VOTA, previously known as Casting Pearls, a Christian rock band, along with Case Maranville. Bryan has been lead singer and guitarist of VOTA since its beginnings in the late 1990s.

Bryan was called to perform with Inpop labelmates Newsboys when guitarist Jody Davis was unable to perform due to his daughter's illness. Bryan was officially announced as Davis' replacement in February 2004, and remained lead guitarist and background vocalist in the group until January 2006, when he left the band to focus on his other band, VOTA (then known as Casting Pearls).

References

Musicians from Hartford, Connecticut
Living people
1973 births
American rock musicians
Newsboys members